The Greeks in Lebanon (οι Έλληνες στο Λίβανο) had presence in present day Lebanon that dated to ancient times, and the Phoenicians and Greeks (both maritime peoples) shared close ties. The Greek alphabet, for example, is derived from the Phoenician one. The Greek presence is attested by several place names, and the close ties between Greeks and the Lebanese Greek Orthodox and Greek Catholic communities.

History

In ancient times Lebanon was the site of several Greek colonies. Following Christianization Greek culture remained a strong influence, waning as the centuries passed, though not disappearing. The city of Amioun (possibly from the  word for Greeks, Yunan), capital of the Koura District (in turn from the Greek χωριά, "villages") in the north of the country is a living testament of that. Following the 2006 invasion of Lebanon by Israel most Greeks have fled the country, although there remains a Greek community in Beirut (Greater Beirut) as well as in the aforementioned Koura District.

Greek Muslims in Lebanon

There are about 7,000 Greeks living in Tripoli, Lebanon and in El Mina, Lebanon. The majority of them are Muslims of Cretan origin and some of them are of Greek Muslim origin. Records suggest that the community left Crete between 1866 and 1897, on the outbreak of the last Cretan uprising against the Ottoman Empire, which ended the Greco-Turkish War of 1897. Many Greek Muslims of Lebanon somewhat managed to preserve their identity and language. Until the Lebanese Civil War, their community was close-knit and entirely endogamous. However many of them left Lebanon during the 15 years of the war. By 1988, many Greek Muslims from both Lebanon and Syria had reported being subject to discrimination by the Greek embassy because of their religious affiliation. The community members would be regarded with indifference and even hostility, and would be denied visas and opportunities to improve their Greek through trips to Greece.

See also
Achrafieh district, Beirut
Amioun
Antiochian Greek Christians
Greece–Lebanon relations
Greeks in Saudi Arabia
Greeks in Syria
Koura District
Lebanese people in Greece
Lebanese people in Cyprus

References

 
Antiochian Greeks
Ethnic groups in Lebanon
European diaspora in Lebanon
 
Lebanon
Ethnic groups in the Middle East